Erik Wielenberg (born March 11, 1972)  is an author and professor of philosophy at DePauw University in Greencastle, Indiana.

As an atheist, Wielenberg defends nontheistic moral realism.

Selected publications
Value and Virtue in a Godless Universe, Cambridge University Press, 2005, .
God and the Reach of Reason: C.S. Lewis, David Hume, and Bertrand Russell, Cambridge University Press, 2008, .
New Waves in Philosophy of Religion with Yujin Nagasawa. Palgrave Macmillan, 2008, .

References

1972 births
American non-fiction writers
American atheists
American ethicists
Atheist philosophers
DePauw University faculty
Living people
Moral realists
Writers from Racine, Wisconsin